Iago Iglesias Castro (born 23 February 1984 in A Coruña, Galicia) is a Spanish professional footballer who plays as an attacking midfielder.

Club career
Bought by hometown's Deportivo de La Coruña from amateurs Atlético Arteixo in 2005, Iago spent two seasons alternating between the first team and the reserves, without ever establishing himself in the former. He made his debut in La Liga on 20 October 2005, playing the second half of a 0–1 home loss against CA Osasuna.

For the 2007–08 campaign, Iago was loaned to second division side Elche CF, also being used rarely. In that summer, he was released by Depor and joined Valencia CF Mestalla.

After leaving Valencia's reserves, Iago kept fit training with his first club Laracha CF, joining another team in the third level shortly after, Montañeros CF also in the A Coruña region.

International career
In May 2006, Iago was called up for a Spain under-21 side match against Denmark, only a few months after making his professional debut with Deportivo. He earned the first of his two caps by coming on as a second-half substitute in the 0–2 loss in Brøndby, on the 17th.

References

External links

1984 births
Living people
Spanish footballers
Footballers from A Coruña
Association football midfielders
La Liga players
Segunda División players
Segunda División B players
Tercera División players
Deportivo Fabril players
Deportivo de La Coruña players
Elche CF players
Valencia CF Mestalla footballers
Racing de Ferrol footballers
Spain under-21 international footballers